The Model Code of Conduct is a set of guidelines issued by the Election Commission of India for the conduct of political parties and candidates during elections mainly with respect to speeches, polling day, polling booths, portfolios, election manifestos, processions, and general conduct. This set of norms has been evolved with the consensus of political parties who have consented to abide by the principles embodied in the said code in its letter and spirit. The Model Code of Conduct comes into force immediately on the announcement of the election schedule by the commission for the need of ensuring free and fair elections. Its main purpose is to ensure that ruling parties, at the Centre and in the States, do not misuse their position of advantage to gain an unfair edge. It is designed to avert practices that are deemed corrupt under the model code of conduct. For example, politicians should not make hate speeches, put one community against another, invoke religion or make promises about new projects that may sway a voter.

For the 2019 Indian general election the code came into force on 10 March 2019 when the Commission announced the dates and remains in force till the end of the electoral process.

Highlights
The main points of the code of conduct are:
 The government may not lay any new ground for projects or public initiatives once the Model Code of Conduct comes into force. 
Government bodies are not to participate in any recruitment process during the electoral process.
 The contesting candidates and their campaigners must respect the home life of their rivals and should not disturb them by holding roadshows or demonstrations in front of their houses. The code tells the candidates to keep it away.
 The election campaign rallies and roadshows must not hinder the road traffic.
 Political parties and candidates should refrain from any activity which may aggravate existing differences or create mutual hatred or cause tension between different castes and communities, religious or linguistic or otherwise. Asking for votes in the name of religion is not allowed.
 Candidates are asked to refrain from distributing liquor to voters. It is a widely known fact in India that during election campaigning, liquor may be distributed to the voters.
 The election code in force hinders the government or ruling party leaders from launching new welfare programs like the construction of roads, provision of drinking water facilities, etc., or any ribbon-cutting ceremonies.
 The code instructs that public spaces like meeting grounds, helipads, government guest houses, and bungalows should be equally shared among the contesting candidates. These public spaces should not be monopolized by a few candidates.
 On polling day, all party candidates should cooperate with the poll-duty officials at the voting booths for an orderly voting process. Candidates should not display their election symbols near and around the poll booths on the polling day. No one should enter the booths without a valid pass from the Election Commission.
 There will be poll observers to whom any complaints can be reported or submitted.
 The ruling party should not use its seat of power for campaign purposes.
 The ruling party ministers should not make any ad-hoc appointments of officials, which may influence the voters to vote in favor of the party in power.
 Before using loudspeakers during their poll campaigning, candidates and political parties must obtain permission or license from the local authorities. The candidates should inform the local police for conducting election rallies to enable the police authorities to make required security arrangements.

References

MODEL CODE OF CONDUCT FOR THE GUIDANCE OF POLITICAL PARTIES AND CANDIDATES

Elections in India
Codes of conduct